Letterkenny Munitions Center, located on Letterkenny Army Depot in Franklin County, Pennsylvania, is a satellite activity under Crane Army Ammunition Activity in Crane, Indiana. The center maintains, stores, and demilitarizes tactical missiles and conventional ammunition for the Army, Air Force and Navy. LEMC assembles, disassembles and tests missiles and missile sections and is also responsible for every aspect of conventional ammunition and missiles to include demilitarization, renovation and X-ray.  The facility is part of the US Army Joint Munitions Command.

Capabilities
Capabilities of the center include: logistics support; storage; non-destructive testing; missile maintenance; munitions maintenance and renovation; and demilitarization.

History
Letterkenny Army Depot was established in 1941 as an ammunition and general supply storage depot. In 1961, its Directorate of Ammunition Operations began supporting Army air defense missiles and Air Force intercept missiles. In 1991, the Directorate of Ammunition Operations was renamed Letterkenny Munitions Center with command and control transferred to Crane Army Ammunition Activity. LEMC is a tenant on Letterkenny Army Depot.

Facilities
LEMC occupies 16,000 of Letterkenny’s . Its facilities include 13 buildings,  of explosive storage space, 902 igloos, 26 rail docks,  of railroad,  of paved road, and a containerization facility.

Environment
Letterkenny was placed on the Environmental Protection Agency’s National Priority List
(Superfund) in 1987.

Information compiled from

External links

Joint Munitions Command website

Industrial installations of the United States Army
United States Army logistics installations
Buildings and structures in Franklin County, Pennsylvania